The Mask Singer, also known as The Mask Singer หน้ากากนักร้อง), is a Thai singing competition television series presented by Kan Kantathavorn. It aired every Thursday from 6 October 2016 to 3 September 2020 on Workpoint TV. In its entire original broadcast, The Mask Singer generated the highest ratings for a Thai variety game show in the digital TV era.

Creation
Workpoint TV was offered the airing rights for South Korea's reality show King of Mask Singer, but they decided to purchase rights for the Shows 'Let Me In' and 'I Can See Your Voice' instead. When a Chinese company decided to produce their own version of King of Mask Singer, Workpoint TV then decided to purchase rights to King of Mask Singer.

Format
The contestants are broken up into four groups, each group containing 8 masked celebrities. Each episode consists of two pairs of battling contestants, up until the final for each group, where the contestants perform a duet before battling it out.

The winner reveals their identity in the last episode of each season, unlike the Korean and Chinese versions, where the winner continues into the next season, only revealing their identity after a defeat.

The contestants are prompted to sing a song of their choice and design a unique costume with a team of designers. Each costume covers the entirety of the contestant's body, unlike in the Korean and Chinese versions, which only require face covering.

The identity of each contestant is kept confidential. When they arrive at the studio, staff members bring them cloaks to conceal their identity. Before filming the show, each contestant has to sign a contract ensuring they keep their identity a secret. During rehearsals, their voices are modified. The staff members who are authorized to know contestants' identity such as makeup artists, costume designers, the director, and studio staff, have signed contracts to keep it confidential. When editing the footage and audio, they lock the doors to stop anyone from looking through.

Season overview

Season 1

The first season of The Mask Singer aired every Thursday at 20:00 from 6 October 2016 to 30 March 2017. The average rating for the season was 7.135.

Issara Kitnichi	as "Durian Mask" was the season's winner.

Season 2

The second season aired every Thursday at 20:00 from 6 April 2017 to 17 August 2017. The average rating for the season was 7.311, the highest-rated season of the franchise.

Sarunrat Visutthithada as "Sumo Mask" was the season's winner.

Season 3

The third season aired every Thursday at 20:15 from 7 September 2017 to 1 February 2018. The average rating for the season was 3.579.

Anuwat Sanguansakpakdee	as "Green Tea Worm Mask" was the season's winner.

Season 4

The fourth season aired every Thursday at 20:15 from 8 February 2018 to 21 June 2018. The average rating for the season was 2.284.

Tanont Chumroen	as "Little Duck Mask" was the season's winner.

Project A

The fifth season, also known as The Mask Project A, aired every Thursday at 20:05 from 28 June 2018 to 4 October 2018. The average rating for the season was 2.324.

Piyanut Sueachongpru as "The Sun Mask" was the season's winner.

After the finale episode, a two-part special called The Mask Truce Day aired on Thursday at 20:05, starting from 11–18 October 2018. The average rating for the special was 1.936.

Line Thai

The sixth season, also known as The Mask Line Thai, aired every Thursday at 20:05 from 25 October 2018 to 7 March 2019. The average rating for the season was 2.897.

Prangthip Thalaeng as "Tuk-Tuk Mask" was the season's winner.

After the finale episode, a two-part special called The Mask Line Prang aired on Thursday at 20:05, starting from 14 to 21 March 2019. The average rating for the special was 2.158.

Thai Literature

The seventh season, also known as The Mask Thai Literature, aired every Thursday at 20:05 from 28 March 2019 to 8 August 2019. The average rating for the season was 2.456.

Sivakorn Adulsuttikul and Jackrin Kungwankiatichai as "Holvichai−Kavee Mask" were the season's winner. They are the youngest champions and the first and only duo to win the franchise.

After the finale episode, a two-part special called The Mask Mirror aired on Thursday at 20:05, starting from 15–22 August 2019. The average rating for the special was 2.158.

Zodiac

The eighth season, also known as The Mask Zodiac, aired every Thursday at 20:05 from 29 August 2019 to 7 November 2019. The average rating for the season was 1.921.

Muanpair Panaboot as "Sagittarius Mask" was the season's winner.

Temple Fair

The ninth season, also known as The Mask Temple Fair, aired every Thursday at 20:05 from 13 February 2020 to 21 May 2020. The average rating for the season was 1.799.

Jaruwat Cheawaram as "Snake Wife Mask" was the season's winner. He previously won in another singing competition show, known as The Star in 2012.

Thai Descendant

The tenth and last season of The Mask Singer, also known as The Mask Thai Descendant, aired every Thursday at 20:05 from 28 May 2020 to 3 September 2020. The average rating for the season was 1.369, the lowest-rated season of the franchise.

Ble Patumrach R Siam as "Bamboo Sticky Rice	Mask" was the season's winner.

The Mask Mirror

The Mask Mirror, a special 13-episode side season, aired from 14 November 2019 to 6 February 2020 on Workpoint TV after the original airing of The Mask Zodiac. The show involves the public guessing which of the contestants, who are referred to as "Mirrors," have real identities and which have false identities.

The average rating for the side season was 1.795.

References

 
Television series by Workpoint Entertainment
2010s Thai television series
2016 Thai television series debuts
Thai-language television shows
Thai music television series
Music competitions in Thailand
Thai television series based on South Korean television series
Workpoint TV original programming
Masked Singer